In theater, a shell (also known as an acoustical shell, choral shell or bandshell) is a curved, hard surface designed to reflect sound towards an audience.

Often shells are designed to be removable, either rolling away on wheels or lifting into a flyspace. Shells are most commonly used for orchestras, bands and choirs, although they can also be used in any application that requires passive sound amplification. Shells are generally made of hard materials because they are designed to absorb as little sound as possible.

History
Acoustical shells were developed to focus sound outward in one direction as opposed to the ″sound in the round″ diffused from all sides of the open gazebo bandstand. In the United States they were built in large city parks and amusement parks as bands increased in size.

Free−standing outdoor shells in a variety of styles were built starting in the 1890s. Professional architects were often employed to design them with varying degrees of acoustical success. The Hollywood Bowl shell, based on a 1928 prototype by Lloyd Wright, has been rebuilt several times with the present structure being the fifth on that site.

Rectangular pavilions with enclosed shell and stage like the example pictured in Boise, Idaho were in use after 1900. These proved very effective as outdoor performing venues, and many are still in use.

See also
 Amphitheatre
 Bandstand
 Hollywood Bowl
 List of contemporary amphitheatres

Fly system
Parts of a theatre
Theatrical sound production
Buildings and structures by type